East Aberthaw Coast is a Site of Special Scientific Interest in the Vale of Glamorgan, south Wales. Villages in the area include Aberthaw (East and West) and Gileston. Part of this area of the coast is known as The Leys.

See also
List of Sites of Special Scientific Interest in Mid & South Glamorgan

Sites of Special Scientific Interest in the Vale of Glamorgan
Coast of the Vale of Glamorgan